The Volvo Olympian was a rear-engined 2-axle and 3-axle double decker bus chassis manufactured by Volvo at its Irvine, Scotland factory. The first was built in 1992 and entered production in March 1993, replacing the Leyland Olympian.

History
The design was based on its predecessor, the Leyland Olympian, but the chassis was modified such that only the chassis design and layout remained, with even the grade of steel for the chassis members being changed, Volvo's standard electrical system was used, as well as standard Volvo steering/"Z cam" braking systems. The early Volvo Olympians were offered with Cummins L10 or Volvo TD102KF engine, coupled to Voith DIWA or ZF Ecomat gearbox. From late 1996, only the 9.6-litre Volvo D10A-245 Euro II engine with electronic diesel control was offered.

It was available with Alexander R-type, Northern Counties Palatine/Palatine 2 and East Lancs E Type/Pyoneer bodywork.

The Volvo Olympian remained as popular as the Leyland Olympian in the United Kingdom and Ireland. A large number of Olympians were exported to Hong Kong and Singapore; most of them being air-conditioned.

Orders

United Kingdom

The Volvo Olympian, like its Leyland predecessor, was very popular in the United Kingdom; most of the UK versions had two rather than three axles.

London United, Metroline, Stagecoach London, London Central, London General, Capital Citybus, MTL London, Harris Bus and First CentreWest had received 687 Volvo Olympians between 1994 and 1999. Because of a low-floor rule that had to be complied with by 2006, these buses were not in service for long.

In 2008, the Low Emission Zone finally ousted the remaining Volvo Olympians in London. Metroline quit Volvo Olympians service in June 2008, displaced by Alexander Dennis Enviro200Darts. Some of them went to Ensignbus for rail replacement work.

In April 2000, Singapore Bus Services had sent two Volvo Olympians, one to Nottingham and one to Metroline. Metroline replaced the tropical windows and the doors with British standard products and reregistered it. It was the first to be sent to Ensignbus in September 2005.

Many other operators outside London received Volvo Olympians, the main operator being FirstGroup. Lothian Regional Transport were among major operators in Scotland, ordering with Alexander R-type bodies, 68 of these being Alexander Royales, while Kelvin Central Buses and Strathclyde Buses also took on Olympians with Royale bodies.

Ireland

Dublin Bus had continued their Olympian orders with the RA batch on the Leyland chassis being ordered first (RA176 - RA325), with 150 buses being ordered between 1994 and 1996. From January 1997, Dublin Bus ordered a further 315 Volvo Olympians, which were designated as RV. During that period, new liveries were introduced, such as CitySwift and the switch of the core livery from two-tone green and orange to white, blue and orange. All Volvo Olympians were withdrawn by the end of 2012.

Hong Kong

Kowloon Motor Bus had ordered 531 Volvo Olympian 11m, 338 Volvo Olympian 12m and 30 Volvo Olympian non-aircon buses between 1994 and 1999. Long Win sold 10 12-metre Volvo Olympians to KMB in 1999. Due to the modernisation of the fleet, all Volvo Olympians have been withdrawn or converted to training buses, but they were withdrawn in November 2017.

Citybus had ordered 10 Volvo Olympian 10.4m, 2 Volvo Olympian 12m (second hand from China Light & Power), 310 Volvo Olympian 12m and 142 Volvo Olympian 11m (two second-hand from China Motor Bus) between 1994 and 1998. Due to the modernisation of the fleet, most of the buses were either withdrawn, sold or converted to training buses. These were withdrawn in March 2019.

China Motor Bus ordered 64 Volvo Olympians between 1996 and 1998. 62 were sold to New World First Bus in 1998 and 5 of them were converted to open-top for Rickshaw Sightseeing Bus. New World First Bus received 2 12-metre Volvo Olympians from HACTL in 1999 and 10 from Citybus in 2014. All buses were withdrawn as they aged 16 – 17 years and the last batch of buses were withdrawn in October 2015. NWFB transferred two second-hand buses to Citybus for private hire fleet, these were withdrawn again by March 2019.

Singapore

In 1993, Singapore Bus Services had ordered 100 Volvo Olympian 2-Axle and 201 Volvo Olympian 3-Axle to replace the then retiring earlier batches of Leyland Atlanteans with Walter Alexander Royale bodywork. These Volvo Olympians were delivered between June 1994 and June 1995.

The Volvo Olympian 2-Axle are the last non-air conditioned buses to be brought in by Singapore Bus Services and also the last non air-conditioned buses in Singapore. Due to the additional weight of the air-compressor which necessitated a third axle, they were unable to be retrofitted with air-conditioning. In late 2003, most of these buses were redeployed to industrial routes to replace the then outgoing Leyland Olympian 2-Axles. Half of this batch had their lifespan extended by 2 years due to insufficient deliveries of new buses. All units were retired between June 2011 and September 2013, and the non-airconditioned bus fare structure was abolished shortly after.

The first batch of Volvo Olympian 3-Axle were largely similar in appearance to the Leyland Olympian 3-Axle, except for some minor technical differences. To maximise capacity, all buses except one were retrofitted with a standee area on the offside by removing 4 pairs of seats in the early 2000s. In 2011, most of these buses were given a 2 year lifespan extension, with some units receiving an additional six months to 1 year extension owing to insufficient deliveries of replacements. All units of this batch were retired between March 2012 and June 2015.

In 1996, SBS ordered a second batch of 200 Volvo Olympian 3-Axle to replace some of the then-retiring Mercedes-Benz O305 and Leyland Atlantean. These buses were delivered between August 1996 and February 1998. To maximise capacity, all buses had 4 pairs of seats removed on the offside to create a standee area in the early 2000s. In 2014, most of these buses in this batch were given a lifespan extension of 2 years due to insufficient deliveries of new buses. All units were retired between August 2013 and October 2016. These buses were also the last double deck buses in Singapore to use plastic destination signages.

In 1998, SBS ordered the last batch of 70 Volvo Olympian 3-Axle with Walter Alexander Royale bodywork, which were delivered with the standee area pre-installed. Registered between March 1999 and December 2000, all units were retrofitted with LECIP electronic destination signages (EDS) in the early 2010s. Unlike the earlier batches, none of these buses received a lifespan extension of 2 years owing to a large influx of replacements. All units of this batch were retired between March 2016 and December 2017.

End of production
Production of Volvo Olympian ended in 2000 and concluded a run of over 10,000 Leyland/Volvo Olympian chassis. The last built were for Yorkshire Coastliner and had Alexander Royale bodies. The chassis had two low-floor successors: the 2-axle Volvo B7TL and the 3-axle Volvo Super Olympian. It was intended that the Volvo B7L replace the Olympian, however, very few Dual Axle, Double deck B7Ls were produced, with the B7TL chassis carrying out the B7Ls intended role.

References

External links

Flickr gallery

Tri-axle buses
Double-decker buses
Open-top buses
Vehicles introduced in 1992
Olympian
Bus chassis